During the 1999–2000 English football season, AFC Bournemouth competed in the Football League Second Division where they finished in 16th position on 57 points.

Final league table

Results
Bournemouth's score comes first

Legend

Football League Division Two

League Cup

FA Cup

Football League Trophy

Squad
Appearances for competitive matches only

See also
1999–2000 in English football

External links
 Bournemouth 1999–2000 at soccerbase.com (use drop down list to select relevant season)

AFC Bournemouth seasons
AFC Bournemouth